Emiel Wastyn (born 1 January 1992) is a Belgian professional racing cyclist. He now rides for the Continental Team . His biggest victory was in 2015 where he managed to win Izegem Koerse, he won the sprint before Michael Van Staeyen and Timothy Dupont.

Personal life 
Wastyn was born in Menen, Belgium, and now lives in Geluwe. Wastyn went to Ghent University, where he combined cycling with his studies for industrial engineering.

Career

Youth 
Wastyn started with sports at a young age. He soon focussed on cycling. In 2010 Wastyn rode as a junior in the World championship of cycling in service of Jasper Stuyven, who took the bronze medal. During the time at Ghent University, he rode for Jong Vlaanderen-Bauknecht. Until he went to  during his final year at university.

2015 

After Wastyn obtained his master's degree in industrial engineering he could fully focus on cycling. His most important result was a victory in Izegem Koerse; he won the sprint and finished before Michael Van Staeyen and Timothy Dupont.

2016 

After a promising year, where Wastyn showed to have the potential, he eventually signed for the Irish cycling team . With his new team he showed to have a pair of fast legs. He is often used as a lead out for one of his fast teammates. But he also manages to ride some good results too. In GP Criquielion he finished 4th. In An Post Ras he finished 4 times in the top 10, got a fifth place for the Green jersey in the sprint. As a lead out in the sprint he helped his teammate Aaron Gate to a second consecutive green jersey.

Major results

2008
 2nd West-Vlaams Kampioenschap

2013 (Under-23) - 1 victory
 Victory in Beselare - Zonnebeke
 2nd in Vremde

2014 (Under-23)
 2nd in Mémorial Gilbert Letêcheur Rochefort

2015 - 1 victory
 Victory in Izegem Koers
 3rd in Omloop van de Grensstreek Wervik
 3rd in Heusden
 4th in Zillebeke - Westouter - Zillebeke
 5th in Memorial Noël Soetaert
 5th in Brussel-Zepperen

2016
 4th in Grand Prix Criquielion
 5th general classification Green jersey An Post Rás

References

External links 
 Emiel Wastyn on ProCyclingStats
 Emiel Wastyn on Wielersite

1992 births
Living people
Belgian male cyclists
People from Menen
Cyclists from West Flanders